The Maldives competed at the 2010 Summer Youth Olympics, the inaugural Youth Olympic Games, held in Singapore from 14 August to 26 August 2010.

Athletics

Boys
Track and Road Events

Badminton

Girls

Swimming

References

External links
Competitors List: Maldives

2010 in Maldivian sport
Nations at the 2010 Summer Youth Olympics
Maldives at the Youth Olympics